The Italian basketball champions are the annual winners of the highest basketball competition in Italy. The winner of the Lega Basket Serie A (LBA) is crowned Italian champion.

Olimpia Milano hold the record for the most championships with 28.

Finals (1976–present)
In the 1976–77 season, play-offs were introduced to determine the national champion.

Finals performances by clubs
Teams in italic are inactive or dissolved.

Notes

References

Basketball in Italy
Football competitions in Germany